Final Days: Anthems for the Apocalypse is the second greatest hits album by punk-metal band The Plasmatics, and the band's final release. It was released through Gigasarus Records in 2002.

Track listing
 "The Doom Song" - (From the Metal Priestess EP)
 "Stop" - (From the Coup de Grace album)
 "Brain Dead" - (From the Maggots: The Record album)
 "Masterplan" - (From the Beyond the Valley of 1984 album)
 "Just Like on TV" - (From the Coup de Grace album)
 "Propagators" - (From the Maggots: The Record album)
 "Uniformed Guards" - (From the Coup de Grace album)
 "Opus in Cm7" - (From the WOW album)
 "Lies" - (From the Deffest! and Baddest! album)
 "The Damned" - (From the Coup de Grace album)
 "A Pig is a Pig" - (From the Beyond the Valley of 1984 album)
 "Finale" - (From the Maggots: The Record album)

References

2002 greatest hits albums
Plasmatics albums